Thomas F. Murphy may refer to:
                              
Thomas F. Murphy (author) (born 1939), American author
Thomas Francis Murphy (1905–1995), American federal prosecutor and judge